The 1999 Omloop Het Volk was the 53rd edition of the Omloop Het Volk cycle race and was held on 27 February 1999. The race started in Ghent and finished in Lokeren. The race was won by Frank Vandenbroucke.

General classification

References

1999
Omloop Het Nieuwsblad
Omloop Het Nieuwsblad
February 1999 sports events in Europe